The 2022 Missouri Tigers baseball team represents the University of Missouri in the 2022 NCAA Division I baseball season. The Tigers play their home games at Taylor Stadium.

Previous season

The Tigers finished 15–36, 8–22 in the SEC to finish in last place in the East division. They were not invited to the postseason.

2021 MLB Draft
The Tigers had one player drafted in the 2021 MLB draft.

Personnel

Roster

Coaching Staff

Transfers

Schedule and results

Standings

Results

Player statistics

Batting

Pitching

Source:

Awards and honors

In-season awards

Fox Leum
SEC Player of the Week for the week of March 28, 2022

Postseason awards

Josh Day
All-SEC Second Team

Rankings

References

Missouri
Missouri Tigers baseball seasons
Missouri Tigers baseball